The John Carney House is a historic house located at 306 E. Market St. in Troy, Illinois. The house was built in 1871 for John Carney, a local businessman, and his wife Elizabeth, who came from the locally prominent Koerner family. The Italianate house is one of the few designed in the style in Troy. The two-story house features a recessed three-story tower at the entrance. The porches at the front and rear entrances have Victorian designs with post arches and brackets. The house's design includes tall round-headed windows and scrolled brackets along the cornice.

The house was added to the National Register of Historic Places on July 28, 1983.

References

Houses on the National Register of Historic Places in Illinois
Italianate architecture in Illinois
Houses completed in 1871
Houses in Madison County, Illinois
National Register of Historic Places in Madison County, Illinois